Bauyrzhan Turysbek (born 15 October 1991) is a Kazakhstani football midfielder.

Career

Club
Turysbek started his career in Sunkar, after youth career in same club. He had 13 appearances and 1 goal in Kazakhstan Premier League. In the first half of 2014, he played with Spartak Semey. In the summer of 2014, he moved abroad and joined Serbian SuperLiga club Radnički Niš. He made his Jelen SuperLiga debut for Radnički Niš on 29 September 2014 in away lost against Spartak Subotica with result 1–0. He was substituted in for Vladan Pavlović in the 85th minute of the match with number 44 on his back. He made 4 appearances with Radnički Niš in the first half of the 2014–15 season, before returning to Kazakhstan and joining top-flight side FC Zhetysu in early 2015.

On 21 June 2016, Turysbek signed a three-and-a-half-year contract with FC Kairat.

On 11 January 2018, FC Tobol announced the signing of Turysbek on a two-year contract.

International
On June 10, 2017, he was part of the Kazakhstan national football team in a quilifiying game for the 2018 FIFA World Cup against Denmark, but ended being an unused substitute.

He was called again for the next round of qualifiers but this time he debuted by entering as substitute in 62 minute, in a game against Montenegro played on September 1, 2017, that Montenegro won by 3-0. He scored his first international goal in a 3-1 loss against Romania.

Career statistics

Club

International

Statistics accurate as of match played 16 October 2018

International goals 
Scores and results list Kazakhstan's goal tally first

Honours
Sunkar
 Kazakhstan First Division: 2011
Kairat
 Kazakhstan Cup: 2017
 Kazakhstan Super Cup: 2017

References

External links
 
 Baurzhan Turysbek stats at utakmica.rs 
 

1991 births
Living people
Association football midfielders
Kazakhstani footballers
Kazakhstan international footballers
Kazakhstani expatriate footballers
FC Sunkar players
FC Spartak Semey players
Expatriate footballers in Serbia
FK Radnički Niš players
Serbian SuperLiga players
FC Zhetysu players
FC Kairat players
FC Tobol players
FC Shakhter Karagandy players
FC Taraz players
Kazakhstan Premier League players
Sportspeople from Almaty